Eric Gustav Sundblad (29 July 1897 – 24 February 1983) was a Swedish sprinter. He competed at the 1920 Summer Olympics, where he finished fifth in the 4 x 400 m relay and failed to reach the final of the individual 400 m event.

References

1897 births
1983 deaths
Athletes from Stockholm
Swedish male sprinters
Athletes (track and field) at the 1920 Summer Olympics
Olympic athletes of Sweden
20th-century Swedish people